My House is the second extended play by American rapper Flo Rida. It was released on April 7, 2015, by Poe Boy Entertainment and Atlantic Records. It is Flo Rida's first release to feature original material since Wild Ones (2012). It features guest appearances from Robin Thicke, Verdine White, Akon, Chris Brown, Sage the Gemini, Lookas, DJ Frank E and Fitz.

Commercial performance
The album debuted at number 14 on the Billboard 200 with 27,000 equivalent album units; it sold 8,000 copies in its first week, and boasted over 5 million streams.

Track listing

Charts

Weekly charts

Year-end charts

Certifications

Notes 
Track 7, "That's What I Like", was first heard during a trailer for The Peanuts Movie. It was later used in the film during a montage sequence where Charlie Brown becomes popular in school, after scoring a perfect score on his test. (Which in actuality was Peppermint Patty's)

References

External links 
 

2015 EPs
Flo Rida albums
Atlantic Records EPs
Albums produced by Cirkut
Albums produced by DJ Frank E
Albums produced by Dr. Luke
Albums produced by Josh Abraham
Albums produced by Johan Carlsson